The 2022 McNeese State Cowboys baseball team represented McNeese State University during the 2022 NCAA Division I baseball season. The Cowboys played their home games at Joe Miller Ballpark and were led by ninth–year head coach Justin Hill. They were members of the Southland Conference.

Preseason

Southland Conference Coaches Poll
The Southland Conference Coaches Poll was released on February 10, 2022 and the Cowboys were picked to finish second in the conference with 80 votes and three first place votes.

Preseason All-Southland Team & Honors

First Team
Tre Obregon III – Designated Hitter
Payton Harden – Outfielder

Second Team
Julian Gonzales – Outfielder

Personnel

Schedule and results

Schedule Source:
*Rankings are based on the team's current ranking in the D1Baseball poll.
|}

References

McNeese State Cowboys
McNeese Cowboys baseball seasons
McNeese State Cowboys baseball